The Information Resources Management Journal (IRMJ) is a quarterly peer-reviewed applied research academic journal which focuses on information technology management. It is published by IGI Global. The journal was established in 1988.

The journal is published in association with the Information Resources Management Association.

Abstracting and indexing
The journal is abstracted and indexed by the following, among others:

ACM Digital Library
Compendex
DBLP
EBSCO
Emerald Abstracts
INSPEC
Scopus
Web of Science: Emerging Sources Citation Index (ESCI)

References

External links
 

Publications established in 1988
English-language journals
Quarterly journals
IGI Global academic journals
Computer science journals
Information technology management
Information management